Echo Mountain is a ski, snowboard and tubing area located in Clear Creek County, west of Evergreen, Colorado. It is the closest ski area to the Denver metro area.

Description
Echo Mountain is located at the former site of the Squaw Pass Ski Area.  Echo opened late in the 2006 season as a terrain park-only concept. The area began to shift its focus away from terrain-park only and sold at auction in 2012. The new owner turned the ski area into a private ski racing training facility. After several seasons under this concept, the owner filed for bankruptcy in January 2016. The area sold in the fall of 2016 to a company looking to open to the public and appeal to a broader base of snow sports enthusiasts. It is fully lit to offer night skiing.  There are roughly 60 acres of skiable terrain and is located within the Arapaho National Forest and sits on the North face of Chief Mountain (elv. 11,709 ft.).

The main lift, the Hot Laps Special, is a fixed-grip triple that has a turn around time of 4 minutes 39 seconds. The entire mountain is wired for sound so music can also be played. The two lodge buildings are of modern industrial design featuring many windows overlooking the slopes, corrugated metal walls and exposed ceilings.  Modern interior design provides a comfortable place to rest while not on the slopes.

The area was created out of lodgepole pines, bristlecone pines, and Douglas firs.

Change of Ownership 
Echo Mountain was formerly owned by Jerry Petitt and his family. After buying the property in 2002 Petitt revived the ski area. The hill was originally designed and marketed as a terrain park for younger skiers and snowboarders.
In the Summer of 2012, Echo Mountain Park was bought by Nora Pykkonen.  Pykkonen operated Front Range Ski Club, an alpine ski racing facility, out of Echo. Both parties seemed excited about how Echo will change, "I think this will be a very interesting opportunity for them and hopefully in a few years we will hear about an Olympic skier that came out of Echo." said Petitt.
The auction sale was operated by Sheldon Good & Co. In January 2016, Echo Mountain filed for bankruptcy after falling behind on loan payments. In the fall of 2016, the mountain was sold to a new owner in a deal that included all the land, facilities, equipment, snow cats and the chairlift.

Lifts 
Echo’s Yan Triple chairlift was purchased from Vail Resorts’ Heavenly Resort and installed in 2005.  The triple, named Hot Laps Special, is situated to serve the entire mountain.  The second lift is a new covered conveyor lift by RMCE and was installed in 2017. The third lift is also a new covered conveyor lift by RMCE and was installed in 2019.

External links
 Echo Mountain, official website
 The history of Echo Mountain Park on ColoradoSkiHistory.com

Notes

Buildings and structures in Clear Creek County, Colorado
Ski areas and resorts in Colorado
Tourist attractions in Clear Creek County, Colorado